Vampyressa is a genus of bats in the family Phyllostomidae, the leaf-nosed bats. They are known commonly as the yellow-eared bats or yellow-eared vampire bats.

There are five species. Three species were recently moved to the genus Vampyriscus. The two genera are differentiated by the morphology of their bones and teeth and the pattern of their pelage.

Species include:
Vampyressa elisabethae
 Melissa's yellow-eared bat (Vampyressa melissa)
 Southern little yellow-eared bat (Vampyressa pusilla)
Vampyressa sinchi
 Northern little yellow-eared bat (Vampyressa thyone)

References

 
Bat genera
Taxa named by Oldfield Thomas
Taxonomy articles created by Polbot